Rosemary K. Bayer (born January 2, 1959) is a Democratic member of the Michigan Senate, representing the 13th district since 2023.

Before being elected to the state legislature, Bayer worked as a computer engineer and analyst. She serves on the board of directors for SheHive and co-founded the Michigan Council of Women in Technology.

References

External links 
 Official Website
 Rosemary Bayer at milist.org

1959 births
Living people
Central Michigan University alumni
Lawrence Technological University alumni
Women state legislators in Michigan
Democratic Party Michigan state senators
Computer engineers
21st-century American politicians
21st-century American women politicians